Sharon Bar-li is the Deputy Director of the Africa Division of the Ministry of Foreign Affairs (Israel) and was the Israeli ambassador to Ghana and Liberia from 2011 until 2015.  While serving in Ghana, she was responsible for opening the Israeli embassy for the first time in 38 years.,  She was later appointed deputy ambassador to London.

Bar-Li earned a BA in Middle Eastern Studies and Political Science from Tel Aviv University.

References

Israeli women ambassadors
Ambassadors of Israel to Ghana
Ambassadors of Israel to Liberia
Tel Aviv University alumni
Year of birth missing (living people)
Living people